Yarmaq was name for Khazar Kaghanate currency. The term for silver coin was sheleg (it might have direct connection to the term sheqel). The currency was mentioned in the Tale of Bygone Years as tribute money for Vyatichi and other Khazar subjects . Shelegs were probably minted in Kabir (Moxel, client state of Khazar Kaghanate) since approximately 5th c AD. The term for the gold coin might be oka, as they were minted in the same place and called oka

Etymology 
The term meant  since at least early Middle Ages, no other meanings had been attested.

Other versions 
Ar- or yar- evolved from the verb "to cut longitudinally, to split", Turkish verb is also co-originating with the Old Turkic word ır- or yır- which means the same. The name is similar to Mongolian language word "yaarmag" meaning "market," especially outdoor ones that sell wide variety of goods.

Resources
Roman K. Kovalev. "What Does Historical Numismatics Suggest About the Monetary History of Khazaria in the Ninth Century? – Question Revisited." Archivum Eurasiae Medii Aevi 13 (2004): 97–129. 
Roman K. Kovalev. "Creating Khazar Identity through Coins: The Special Issue Dirhams of 837/8."  East Central and Eastern Europe in the Early Middle Ages, ed. Florin Curta, pp. 220–253. Ann Arbor, MI: University of Michigan Press, 2005.

See also
Khazar coinage
Kabir coinage centre

References 

Currencies of Europe
Currencies of Asia
Medieval currencies
Khazars